Uxbridge High School can refer to:
Uxbridge High School (London), Uxbridge, West London, England
Uxbridge High School (Massachusetts), Uxbridge, Massachusetts, United States